Corallus cropanii, or Cropani's tree boa, is a species of boa, a snake in the family Boidae. The species is endemic to the state of São Paulo, Brazil. Like all boas, it is  not venomous. No subspecies are currently recognized. Until 2017, no specimen of this snake had been seen alive since 1953 and only five dead specimens had been collected since then, but in late January 2017, an adult female Cropan's tree boa measuring 1.7 m (5.6 ft) was captured by locals in Ribeira who brought it to herpetologists from the Instituto Butantan and the Museum of Zoology of the University of São Paulo, who radio-tagged and released the animal to learn more about the species' behavior.

The Cropani's tree boa is considered endangered.

Etymology
The specific name, cropanii, is in honor of Italian geologist Ottorino de Fiore, Baron of Cropani.

Habitat
The preferred natural habitat of C. cropanii is forest.

Description
Corallus cropanii has dorsal scales in more than 30 rows, but fewer than 36 rows, at midbody. It has deep sensory pits on most or all upper labials.

Behavior
Corallus cropanii is very rare. Only between three and six known specimens had ever been collected before the capture in 2017, and virtually nothing was known about its natural history. It has been confirmed recently from the specimen found in Ribeira (and radio-tagged) that Cropan's tree boa is often arboreal.

Reproduction
C. cropanii is viviparous.

Geographic range
C. cropanii is found only on or near the coastal plain at  elevation in the municipalities of Miracatu, Pedro de Toledo, and Santos, in São Paulo, Brazil. The type locality given is "Miracatu, State of São Paulo, Brazil".

References

Further reading

Hoge AR (1953). "A new genus of Boinae from Brazil, Xenoboa cropanii, gen nov., sp. nov." Memórias do Instituto Butantan 25 (1): 27-34 + one plate. (Xenoboa cropanii, new species).
Kluge AG (1991). "Boine Snake Phylogeny and Research Cycles". Miscellaneous Publications, Museum of Zoology, University of Michigan (178): 1-55. PDF at University of Michigan Library. Accessed 11 July 2008.
Henderson RW, Puorto G (1993). "Corallus cropanii (Hoge)". Catalogue of American Amphibians and Reptiles (575): 1-2.

cropanii
Reptiles described in 1953
Taxa named by Alphonse Richard Hoge